Broussard is a city in Lafayette and St. Martin parishes in the U.S. state of Louisiana. The population was 8,197 at the 2010 U.S. census, and 13,417 at the 2020 United States census. Broussard is part of the Lafayette metropolitan statistical area.

History
The community was originally named Côte Gelée (Frozen Hill) because of its hilly ridge area and the severe winter of 1784. Broussard was founded in 1884. It was named after Valsin Broussard, a prominent local merchant, who formed the first vigilante committee when his own store was robbed. He was a direct descendant of Joseph Broussard de Beausoleil, one of the first 200 Acadians to arrive in Louisiana on February 27, 1765, aboard the Santo Domingo.

Primary agricultural resources include sugarcane, soybean and hay production as well as horse and cattle farming. Principal industries consist of oil and gas service companies, food distributors, real estate developments and manufacturing.

Broussard has gone from a horse and buggy community, with large sugarcane plantation homes, to a current day industrial community with over 300 businesses. It was designated a city in November 2002.

Geography
Broussard is located at  (30.142329, -91.963644), in the southern Louisiana region of Acadiana. Most of the city limits are located in Lafayette Parish with a small eastern portion of the city being located in St. Martin Parish.

Louisiana Highway 182 and U.S. Route 90 also pass through the city with Lafayette, the parish seat of Lafayette Parish, being located northwest and New Iberia, the parish seat of Iberia Parish, located southeast. 

According to the United States Census Bureau, the town has a total area of 11.4 square miles (29.6 km), of which 11.4 square miles (29.5 km) is land and 0.04 square mile (0.1 km) (0.18%) is water.

Demographics

As of the 2020 United States census, there were 13,417 people, 4,370 households, and 2,881 families residing in the city. The 2019 American Community Survey determined the racial and ethnic makeup of the city was 78.4% non-Hispanic white, 14.7% Black and African American, 0.3% American Indian and Alaska Native, 1.3% Asian, 0.8% two or more races, and 4.7% Hispanic and Latin American of any race.

Of the population in 2019, there were 4,370 households living in 5,018 housing units. An average of 2.69 people lived in a household. In 2019, the median age of the city was 35.1, and there was a median household income of $82,677. Males had a median income of $62,012 versus $50,930 for females, and 13.3% of the population lived at or below the poverty line.

Sports
The Chitimacha Louisiana Open is a golf tournament of the Web.com Tour played at Le Triomphe Golf & Country Club since 1992.

Notable people
Erin Blanchard, gymnast
Illinois Jacquet, jazz musician

References

External links
 City of Broussard

Populated places established in 1884
Cities in Louisiana
Cities in Lafayette Parish, Louisiana
Cities in St. Martin Parish, Louisiana
Cities in Lafayette, Louisiana metropolitan area
Acadiana
1884 establishments in Louisiana